These 13 is a collaborative studio album by American musicians Jimbo Mathus and Andrew Bird. It was released on March 5, 2021, through Thirty Tigers. Recording sessions took place at Hollywood Sound Recorders in Los Angeles and at Barebones Studios. Production was handled by Mike Viola. The album peaked at number 65 on the Top Album Sales in the United States. The album was met with generally favorable reviews from music critics. At Metacritic, which assigns a normalized rating out of 100 to reviews from mainstream publications, the album received an average score of 79, based on nine reviews.

Track listing

Personnel 

 Andrew Bird – vocals, songwriter
 James "Jimbo Mathus" Mathis Jr. – vocals, songwriter
 Susanna Hoffs – harmony vocals (track 9)
 Michael "Mike" Viola – producer
 David Boucher – mixing
 Jeff Lipton – mastering
 Jared Spears – art direction, artwork

Charts

References

External links 

2021 albums
Andrew Bird albums
Collaborative albums
Thirty Tigers albums
Albums produced by Mike Viola